Japanese influence on Korean culture began after the Japanese occupation and annexation of Korea in the 20th century, from 1910 to 1945. During the occupation, the Japanese sought to assimilate Koreans into the Japanese empire by changing laws, policies, religious teachings and education to influence the Korean population.In addition, Korean nationalism continued to rise after the Japanese colonial rule ended and played a large part in the rapid economic development of South Korea.

Since the late 20th century, Japanese influence has mainly involved popular culture. In 1998, Kim Dae-Jung, the president of South Korea, visited Japan and gradually lifted a cultural ban on Japan. South Korea and Japan have reached a consensus to open up a policy of accepting the culture of the other. Japanese popular culture has become more popular among young people in Korea.

Educational culture 
In 1443, Korean King Sejong created 28 characters, and in 1446, 'Hangeul (한글)' was officially distributed under the name of 'Hunminjeongeum (훈민정음)'. Hangeul is the most implicitly structured phonetically and is the character that was created and distributed at a certain time and has been used continuously for about 600 years since then.

Changes in the Korean official language 
During the Japanese colonial period, the Japanese government forced Korean students to study in Japanese for more than 35 years by forcing them to use textbooks written in Japanese.

Lost history and culture 
Later, Japan forced Koreans to learn Japanese only and must use Japanese surnames, which caused Koreans to lose their history and culture because their history was written in Chinese. After 35 years of colonial rule ended, Koreans were no longer forced to learn Japanese.  Under the influence of the national trend of thought that has shaken off the influence of Japanese colonialism, in order to get rid of the imprint of Chinese cultural influence, the use of Chinese characters should be abolished, and primary and junior high schools should not teach Chinese. However, the history of Korean descent is written in Chinese, today, with the exception of scholars, almost no one can read Korean historical documents and biographies in traditional Chinese characters.

Cultural belief 
In August 1915, the Regulations on the Propagation of Religion were issued, it indicates that the three major religions recognized in Korea are Buddhism, Shinto and Christianity. the regulations show that religious activities must comply with the government-general, and that religious managers must follow the government decisions

Buddhism under Japanese occupation 

In 1910, Japan occupied Korea, and to cope with the growth of Japanese missionaries, Korea proposed an auxiliary relationship and used Korean temples as branches of the Japanese denomination.

In June 1911, the government tried to centralize the control of Korea Buddhism by establishing the temple administration and proposed the Temple Ordinance, which cut off the contact between Korean clergy and Japanese clergy by institutionalizing and bureaucratizing Korean Buddhism. According to the Temple Ordinance, the government re-examined each temple and select 30 Korean temples to become representatives of Korean Buddhism, and the Buddhist abbots would have important administrative powers. After that, the relationship of the remaining 1300 temples will be formalized, but the content spread by the temple need to be approved by the government. This regulation has caused the abbots to be obsessed with power and caused a fierce battle for status and causing public grievances.

In 1912, the government proposed temple regulations to the administrators of each temple. Those days associated with modern imperial ideology, such as National Founding Day (Kigensetsu) and the birthday of Emperor (Tenchosetsu) are inseparable from the temple rituals, Korean Buddhism became Japanization. The Japanese colonists promoted the Japanization of Korean Buddhism to eradicate the inherent religious habits and beliefs of Korea to establish a national and cultural identity with Korea to solve the ruling crisis. 
 
In August 1919, the third governor, Saito Makoto, tried to change the overall structure of the government and put in pro-Japanese elements. Also, recognized that Koreans have human rights. This is called the assimilation policy and it also trains pro-Japanese people among religious people.

In 1926, Korean Buddhist believers under Japanese rule were allowed to legally marry, leading temples to bear additional costs of childcare and reducing adherence to monasticism. Some monks claimed these changes violate the rules of Buddhism. Therefore, although the number of Buddhist believers doubled during the Japanese rule, disputes within the temple arose.

Christianity under Japanese occupation 
After Korea became a Japanese protectorate, Western powers also followed. At this time, in the face of Japanese colonial occupation, Christian community leaders resisted by organizing and establishing religious schools, spreading an ideology of Korean nationalism.

The Japanese promulgated a decree to hinder Korean Christianity. It hoped to weaken anti-Japanese sentiment by controlling public opinion, fully assimilating Koreans, and stipulating Japanese as the official language of Korea. However, Christian churches organized and spread anti-colonial sentiment. After the end of Japanese occupation, Christianity is still highly influential in Korean society.

Popular culture 
As a major economic power, Japan has played an influence on Asia for a long time. Especially after the spread of Japanese pop culture in East Asia, Japanese comics, Anime, pop music and TV dramas have become very popular. Japan has found that the commercial value of the pop culture industry is constantly improving, and it can provide a lot of help for the accumulation of capital. Therefore, Japan began to try its best to promote the popular culture industry. Despite the fact that Japan has invaded some of these countries, many people have strongly resisted Japan, and those who have not experienced the cruel aggression of the Middle Ages have no feeling about it. Asian adolescents are defined as one of the most audiences in this industry, and their enthusiasm for new things is not too much of a concern, and they will not delve into the source and history of such consumer goods. Therefore, the Japanese pop culture industry has had a great impact among Asian teenagers.

Since its liberation from Japanese colonial rule in 1945, South Korea has banned Japanese Pop culture and adopted a policy of blocking Japanese popular culture. In 1965, after the establishment of diplomatic relations between South Korea and Japan, the two countries only made frequent economic exchanges, South Korea still banned Japanese culture. After the president of South Korea, Kim Dae-Jung visited Tokyo in 1998, South Korea proposed four steps to gradually lift the ban on Japan. From October 1998 to June 2000, the Japanese culture was implemented in an open policy in three steps. It is expected to complete the fourth ban to accept the spread of Japanese TV programs and popular music, when South Korea and Japan jointly hold the FIFA World Cup in 2002

In 2001, the relationship between South Korea and Japan gradually improved. In the same year, the Japanese ministry of Education passes an application submitted by the Japanese imperialist Association, saying that Japanese textbooks were too self-critical, self-tortured, and degraded for Japanese imperialism. The textbook should be revised to cultivate Japanese national pride. This action angered China and South Korea. Since then, Japan has not changed the textbook anymore. South Korea said they will not implement the last step to lift the ban on Japanese culture in 2002 until the problem is solved.

Japanese culture has also had a strong influence on Korean music and dance. Several K-pop Idols have said they have found inspiration in Japanese adult videos on how to act sexy in performances.

Comic and animation 

In 1998, Korea lifted the ban on Japanese pop culture, Japanese animation officially legalized in Korea. Japan and Korea achieved a low price on television through the co-production of comics. In the late 1980s, Korea learned the technical know-how of Japanese manga through cooperation, and the level of TV animation increased rapidly. By reducing the Japanese flavor of animation and adding Korean local elements, Korean comics have been created and arranged into TV animations. Animation are consumed as a lifestyle, and not only for children and teenager, but also for young people and even older.

Movies and TV drama 
When Korea began to accept Japanese culture gradually, not all Japanese films were allowed to spread in Korea. Only the world's four major international film festivals (Cannes Film Festival, Venice Film Festival, Berlin Film Festival, American Academy Awards) won works or Japan-Korea joint production (more than 20% of Korean funding) can be allowed to spread. In addition, in the case of a Korean director or a Korean protagonist is also required, and only movies recognized as global art can be released in Korea.

In 1999, Japanese film director Shunji Iwai’s movie “Love Letter” was broadcast in South Korea. As the first film released in Korea, it received a great welcome in Korea. The heroine often said, “How are you” which became a popular sentence for Korean youth. Japan has also launched a family TV series to Korea. Japan has changed the Korean's views on Japan by beautifying TV dramas. The Koreans have more understanding of daily life and Japanese families and have improved their impression of Japan .

Novels 
Young Koreans do not learn Japanese after their country became independent, Japanese novels are often translated into Korean. In 1970, Yomaoka Sohachi's novel “Tokugawa Ieyasu” was translated more than 400,000 copies and became an unprecedented bestseller. Gyoho Bunko, a large book store in South Korea, has a corner only for Japanese books and is always busy. In the top ten bestsellers in novels, it is published annually by “Gunpo Bunko”, including works by Japanese artists. Many Japanese artists such as Haruki Murakami, Kaori Ekuni, Banana Yoshimoto, Akira Higashino and Hideo Okuda are popular among young Koreans

Spiritual culture 
When Japan surrendered and Korea became independent, the humiliation of Koreans was released, and the anti-Japan sentiment was very serious. They regarded their rejection of Japan as patriotism, and it was their strong resistance to Japan that caused their strong nationalism and the evidence that they wanted to eradicate all the remnants of Japan.

Korean nationalism 

During the period of imperialist rule in Korea, the Japanese assimilated Koreans and deprived them of their freedom and democracy for further control. The Koreans therefore resisted hard and people united and nationalists began to resist. They marched on the streets, resisting studying and eager to be free from colonial rule. Although Japan built many infrastructures in South Korea during its reign, which has a great influence on the feature development of Korea, nationalists still have a strong resistance to Japan. For many years after liberation, it still strong resists any cultural output of Japan 

In 2018, Iz*One's song "Suki ni natchau daro?" was banned on KBS and SBS. The song's lyrics are composed in Japanese language, which is believed to be the reason. In Japan, there were suspicions that KBS's actions were racism.

See also 
 Korea under Japanese rule
 Chinese influence on Korean culture
 Chinese influence on Japanese culture
 Korean influence on Japanese culture
 Culture of Japan
 Culture of Korea

References 

Korean culture